Propachlor (2-chloro-N-isopropylacetanilide) is an herbicide first marketed by Monsanto. It was registered for use in the United States during 1965.

The preparation acts on annual grasses and on some broadleaf weeds  and was briefly sold in the UK as a germination inhibitor under the name Murphy Covershield.

Between 1987 and 1996, about 2.1 million pounds of its active ingredient were used in the United States. 75% was applied to sorghum crops and 24% to maize.

Monsanto voluntarily discontinued its manufacture in 1998. It is currently listed in the U.S. Environmental Protection Agency's Toxics Release Inventory. In 2008, the European Commission issued a decision withdrawing its approval for use as of March 18, 2009, citing the presence of its metabolites in groundwater. Propachlor was added to California's Proposition 65 list as a carcinogen in 2001.

Current manufacturers 
It is currently being produced by Makhteshim Agan Group and Shenzhen Qinfeng Pesticides Co., Ltd.

References

External links
 

Herbicides
Acetanilides
Organochlorides
Monsanto
Isopropylamino compounds